Sherrit is a surname. Notable people with the surname include:

Jim Sherrit (born 1948), Scottish ice hockey player
John Sherrit (born 1962), Australian drummer